Doratura is a genus of true bugs belonging to the family Cicadellidae.

Species 
Doratura contains 29 species, found in Europe, Central Asia, northern Africa, and Northern America. 
 Doratura arenicola (Logvinenko, 1975)
 Doratura astrachanica (Vilbaste, 1961)
 Doratura butzele (Guglielmino & Bückle, 2021)
 Doratura caucasia (Melichar, 1913)
 Doratura concors (Horváth, 1903)
 Doratura exilis (Horváth, 1903)
 Doratura gravis (Emeljanov, 1966)
 Doratura heterophyla (Horváth, 1903)
 Doratura homophyla (Flor, 1861)
 Doratura horvathi (Wagner, 1939)
 Doratura iblea (D'Urso, 1983)
 Doratura impudica (Horváth, 1897)
 Doratura ivanovi (Kusnezov, 1928)
 Doratura jole (Guglielmino & Bückle, 2022)
 Doratura kusnezovi (Vilbaste, 1961)
 Doratura littoralis (Kuntze, 1937)
 Doratura lobele (Guglielmino & Bückle, 2022)
 Doratura lukjanovitshi (Kusnezov, 1929)
 Doratura marandica (Dlabola, 1981)
 Doratura medvedevi (Logvinenko, 1961)
 Doratura paludosa (Melichar, 1897)
 Doratura rikele (Guglielmino & Bückle, 2022)
 Doratura rosele (Guglielmino & Bückle, 2022)
 Doratura rusaevi (Kusnezov, 1928)
 Doratura salina (Horváth, 1903)
 Doratura stylata (Boheman, 1847)
 Doratura vefele (Guglielmino & Bückle, 2022)
Doratura veneta (Dlabola, 1959)

References 

Cicadellidae
Hemiptera genera